Pelinka is a surname. Notable people with the surname include:

Anton Pelinka (born 1941), Austrian political scientist
Rob Pelinka (born 1969), American lawyer, basketball executive, and former player